Le Cœur d'un homme is an album by the French singer Johnny Hallyday. It was released on November 12, 2007, and achieved huge success in France and Belgium (Wallonia). It was led by the single "Always", a number 2 hit in France, and contains a cover version of Francis Cabrel's 1989 single "Sarbacane". French actor Bruno Putzulu wrote one song of the album. The final track of the album, "I Am the Blues", co-written by U2's lead singer Bono, is a rare example of a Hallyday song in English.

Track listing
 "Monument Valley" (Christian Lejalé, Yvan Cassar - Laurent Vernerey) — 4:01
 "Etre un homme" (Marie-Laure Douce, Yvan Cassar - Laurent Vernerey) — 4:05
 "Always" (Didier Golemanas - Alain Goldstein, Didier Golemanas) — 3:02
 "Chavirer les foules" (Michel Mallory) — 4:13
 "Vous madame" (Jacques Veneruso) — 4:48
 "Je reviendrai dans tes bras" (Jean Fauque, Fred Blondin) — 4:29
 "Que restera-t-il ?" (Didier Golemanas) — 3:53
 "T'aimer si mal" (Marc Lévy, Yvan Cassar) (featuring Taj Mahal) — 4:43
 "Ma vie" (Bruno Putzulu, Yvan Cassar - Laurent Vernerey) — 4:17
 "Laquelle de toi" (Bernard Droguet, Fred Blondin) — 3:33
 "Sarbacane" (Francis Cabrel) — 4:16
 "Ce que j'ai fait de ma vie" (Bernie Taupin - French adaptation : Lionel Florence, Jim Cregan) — 5:16
 "I Am the Blues" (Bono, Simon Carmody) — 4:23

Source : Allmusic.

Personnel
 Denis Benarrosch - drums, percussion
 Doyle Bramhall II - electric guitar, slide guitar
 Yvan Cassar - piano, organ
 Eric Chevalier - programming
 Geoff Dugmore - drums, percussion
 Claude Engel - acoustic guitar, electric guitar, slide guitar
 Mark Goldenberg - acoustic guitar, baritone guitar
 Christophe Guiot - violone
 James Harman - harmonica
 Freddy Koella - acoustic guitar, electric guitar, slide guitar, resonator guitar
 Abraham Laboriel, Sr. - drums, percussion
 Greg Leisz - lap steel guitar
 Robin LeMesurier - acoustic guitar, electric guitar)
 Taj Mahal - guitar
 Keb' Mo' - resonator guitar
 Paul Personne - electric guitar
 Brian Ray - electric guitar
 Eric Sauviat - acoustic guitar, electric guitar, slide guitar, baritone guitar, resonator guitar
 Greg Szlapczynski - harmonica
 Laurent Vernerey - double bass
 Tony Joe White - electric guitar

Releases

Charts

Weekly charts

Year-end charts

Certifications and sales

References

2007 albums
Johnny Hallyday albums
Warner Music France albums